Hiroyuki Miura can refer to the following: